Chad Brown (born September 6, 1996) is an American professional basketball player for Hapoel Gilboa Galil of the Israeli Basketball Premier League. He played college basketball for the UCF Knights.

Early life and high school career
Brown attended Deltona High School at Deltona, Florida. A four star prospect by Scout.com, Brown averaged 14.7 points, 15 rebounds and 9.4 blocks per game as a senior.

College career
Brown played for UCF Knights from 2015 to 2019. As a junior, he averaged 5.2 points and 4.6 rebounds per game, shooting 51 percent from the field, while playing along with Tacko Fall. The same season, he led the team in blocks, averaging 1.1 blocks per game. During his senior season, he averaged 4.5 points, 5 rebounds, and 1 block per game.

Professional career
After going undrafted in the 2019 NBA draft, Brown joined the Dallas Mavericks, on October 17, 2019, but was waived after two days. On October 26, 2020, he was acquired by the Texas Legends. In 42 games, he averaged 5.4 points, 6.2 rebounds and 0.9 blocks per game.

On August 6, 2020, he joined Charilaos Trikoupis of the Greek Basket League. In 10 games with the Greek club, he averaged 12.5 points and 8.9 rebounds per contest. After his impressive tenure with Trikoupis, Brown was bought out by Gießen 46ers of the Basketball Bundesliga. In 12 games with the German club, he averaged 4.3 points and 3.1 rebounds per contest. Brown then finished the season off with the Guelph Nighthawks of the Canadian Elite Basketball League, averaging 13.4 points, 10.6 rebounds, and 2.8 blocks per game. 

On July 27, 2021, Brown signed with Peristeri of the Greek Basket League and the Basketball Champions League. In 24 league games, he averaged 5.6 points, 7.1 rebounds and 0.9 blocks, playing around 18 minutes per contest.

On July 4, 2022, he has signed with Merkezefendi Belediyesi Denizli Basket of the Basketbol Süper Ligi.

On November 12, 2022, he signed with Hapoel Gilboa Galil of the Israeli Basketball Premier League.

References

External links
UCF Knights bio

1996 births
Living people
American men's basketball players
American expatriate basketball people in Canada
American expatriate basketball people in Greece
Basketball players from Florida
Centers (basketball)
Charilaos Trikoupis B.C. players
Guelph Nighthawks players
Giessen 46ers players
Hapoel Gilboa Galil Elyon players
Merkezefendi Belediyesi Denizli Basket players
People from Deltona, Florida
People from Volusia County, Florida
Peristeri B.C. players
UCF Knights men's basketball players